Belekoy is a Filipino delicacy that originated from Bulacan, Philippines. This sweet confection is prepared with flour, sugar, sesame seeds and vanilla. It is baked in a pan where it is then cut into rectangular or square shapes. Variations of this dessert mix in candies and nuts such as caramel, chocolate, and walnuts.

See also

 Pastillas

References

Culture of Bulacan